The San Roque Lake is a reservoir (artificial lake) in the province of Córdoba, Argentina. It was created by the damming of several rivers, especially the Suquía and the Cosquín. It is located next to the city of Villa Carlos Paz, about 600 m above mean sea level. It has a surface area of 16 km², an average depth of 16 m, and a maximum volume of 180 million m³.

The dam was initially built to provide fresh water for the capital and its surroundings. It was designed in 1884 by the engineering firm of Cassaffousth, Bialet Massé and Dumesnil, finished in 1886, and inaugurated officially in 1890. Two years later the dam was suffering from a complete lack of maintenance, however, and a political scandal erupted.

The original dam was finally replaced by a newer one, located 150 m away, by an initiative of Governor Amadeo Sabattini, and completed in 1944. The newer dam was built to contain and control larger rises in water levels. When the engineers tried to demolish the original dam, the dynamite only blew the metal railing. The new dam was therefore built several meters in front of the old one. When the level of the lake is low, the upper part of the old construction can be seen.

References

 Lago San Roque at the website of the National Atomic Energy Commission 
 Municipality of Bialet Massé — ¡El dique se viene! (history of the dam) 

Dams in Argentina
Reservoirs in Argentina
Landforms of Córdoba Province, Argentina
Dams completed in 1944